The 1945 South American Basketball Championship was the 12th edition of this regional tournament.  It was held in Guayaquil, Ecuador and won by the Brazil national basketball team. Six teams competed, including Colombia in their first appearance.  After an experiment with a two-round tournament two years earlier, the 1945 competition returned to a single round format.

Final rankings

Results

Each team played the other five teams once, for a total of five games played by each team and 15 overall in the preliminary round.

External links

FIBA.com archive for SAC1945

1945
S
B
1945 in Ecuador
Champ
Sports competitions in Guayaquil
July 1945 sports events in South America
August 1945 sports events in South America
20th century in Guayaquil